Bathinda Urban Assembly constituency (Sl. No.: 92) is a Punjab Legislative Assembly constituency in Bathinda district, Punjab state, India.

Members of the Legislative Assembly 
 2012: Sarup Chand Singla (SAD)
 2007: Harminder Singh Jassi  (Cong)
 2002: SURINDER SINGLA    [I.N.C.]
 1997: Chiranji Lal Garg  {SAD}

Election Results

2022

2017

Previous Results

References

External links
  

Assembly constituencies of Punjab, India
Bathinda district